Emanuele Zanini (born 15 April 1965) is an Italian professional volleyball coach. He currently serves as head coach for the Belgium national team.

Career as coach
He studied physical education at the University of Bologna graduating in 1988.

He became a head coach in 2000. Zanini coached in his career several teams in Italy and also in Austria, Slovakia, France and Poland. In 1999–2000, he served as an assistant and a coach of physical preparation of the Italy men's national volleyball team. Since 2008, he coached Slovakia men's national team for four seasons leading to their best results in the history.

In August 2013, he was appointed a head coach of the Turkey men's national team for three years. He replaced Bosnian-born Frenchman Veljko Basic, who served at this post since 2010. Zanini became a head coach of the French team Beauvais Oise UC Volley in the same time.

Honours

Clubs
 National championships
 2004/2005  Austrian Cup, with Hypo Tirol Innsbruck
 2004/2005  Austrian Championship, with Hypo Tirol Innsbruck

Youth national team
 2015  FIVB U23 World Championship, with Turkey

References

External links

 
 Coach profile at LegaVolley.it 
 Coach profile at Volleybox.net

Living people
1965 births
Sportspeople from the Province of Mantua
Italian volleyball coaches
University of Bologna alumni
Volleyball coaches of international teams
Italian expatriate sportspeople in Austria
Italian expatriate sportspeople in Slovakia
Italian expatriate sportspeople in France
Italian expatriate sportspeople in Turkey
Italian expatriate sportspeople in Poland
Italian expatriate sportspeople in Croatia
Italian expatriate sportspeople in Belgium
Warta Zawiercie coaches
Resovia (volleyball) coaches